Boyarka or Boiarka is a city in Fastiv Raion of Kyiv Oblast (region) of Ukraine, about 20 km SW from Kyiv. It hosts the administration of Boiarka urban hromada, one of the hromadas of Ukraine.  Population: . The population in 2001 was 35,968.

History
There are traces of an old Kyivan Rus' settlement, including the remains of an ancient cemetery. The railway reached the town in the 1860s, after which it became a favourite resort for artists and writers, including the composer Mykola Lysenko and the writer Sholom Aleichem. The fictional dacha settlement of Boyberik, where events of Aleichem's tales of Tevye the Milkman take place, is based on Boyarka.

Until 18 July 2020, Boiarka belonged to Kyiv-Sviatoshyn Raion. The raion was abolished that day as part of the administrative reform of Ukraine, which reduced the number of raions of Kyiv Oblast to seven. The area of Kyiv-Sviatoshyn Raion was split between Bucha, Fastiv, and Obukhiv Raions, with Boiarka being transferred to Fastiv Raion.

Present-day
The Kyiv Oblast orphanage is located in Boyarka.

The town is also the location of the Boyarka Metrological Centre, owned by the company Naftogaz, which provides calibration services for gas-flow meters.

During the years 2005 to 2007, the town hosted the now-defunct football club, FC Inter Boyarka.

Sport
Boyarka has a team called FC Inter Boyarka, that in 2001 was also coached by Yukhym Shkolnykov.

Notable people
Sholem Aleichem, writer
Sergei Balenok, graphic artist, painter, illustrator
Eugene Hütz, singer and composer
George Kistiakowsky, physical chemistry professor
Oleksandra Matviichuk, human rights lawyer
Maks Levin, photographer
Mykola Lysenko, composer
Nikolai Ostrovsky, writer
Mykola Pymonenko, painter
Maria Zankovetska, actress
Bohdan Yermakov, painter

Sources
Andriy Ivchenko, All About Ukraine, Kiev, 2007
Metrological Centre NJSC "Naftogaz of Ukraine" , Kiev, 2009

References

 
Cities in Kyiv Oblast
Cities of district significance in Ukraine
Kyiv metropolitan area